The 1939 Temple Owls football team was an American football team that represented Temple University as an independent during the 1939 college football season. In its first and only season under head coach Fred H. Swan, the team compiled a 2–7 record and was outscored by a total of 96 to 51. The team played its home games at Temple Stadium in Philadelphia. Edward Kolman was the team captain.

Schedule

References

Temple
Temple Owls football seasons
Temple Owls football